A Duel Hand Disaster: Trackher is an action indie 3D video game, developed and published by American game studio Ask An Enemy Studios, for Microsoft Windows, PlayStation 4, and Nintendo Switch.

See also
List of PC games

References

External links
Official website

2017 video games
Action video games
Windows games
Windows-only games
Video games developed in the United Kingdom
Virtual reality games
Indie video games
Nintendo Switch games